Tino Scicluna is an American soccer player currently playing with Waza Flo in the Major Arena Soccer League. He played in the USISL Pro League, National Professional Soccer League, USL Premier Development League, and the Canadian Professional Soccer League.

Playing career 
Scicluna began his professional career in 1998 with Indiana Blast in the USISL Pro League. In his debut season with Indiana, he helped secure a division title. At the conclusion of the USISL Pro League season he signed with Detroit Rockers of the National Professional Soccer League. He played with the organization for three seasons, and appeared in a total of 38 matches and recorded three goals. In 1999, he signed with Mid-Michigan Bucks of the USL Premier Development League. During his tenure with Michigan he won three division titles, and appeared in 95 matches and scored 15 goals. In 2004, he signed with newly formed Windsor Border Stars of the Canadian Professional Soccer League. He helped Windsor capture the Open Canada Cup, and qualify for the postseason. In 2015, he signed with Waza Flo of the Major Arena Soccer League, an organization founded by his brothers.

In 2002, Madonna University hired the services of Scicluna to coach the men's soccer team. On December 5, 2009, he announced his resignation after serving the club for seven seasons.

References 

Living people
Sportspeople from Wayne County, Michigan
American expatriate soccer players
American soccer coaches
Expatriate soccer players in Canada
American expatriate sportspeople in Canada
Indiana Blast players
Detroit Rockers players
Flint City Bucks players
Windsor City FC players
USL Second Division players
National Professional Soccer League (1984–2001) players
USL League Two players
Canadian Soccer League (1998–present) players
Major Arena Soccer League players
Detroit Waza players
Association football midfielders
Soccer players from Michigan
Year of birth missing (living people)
People from Redford, Michigan